Jakelyne de Oliveira Silva (born March 18, 1993 in Rondonópolis) is a Brazilian dancer, model and beauty pageant titleholder who was crowned Miss Brasil 2013 and represented her country at Miss Universe 2013 in Moscow, Russia. In September 2020 she joined the cast of the reality show A Fazenda.

Early life
Oliveira is a model and student of Agricultural and Environmental Engineering.

Pageantry

Miss Globe International 2012
Oliveira won the Miss Globe International 2012 Pageant, being the fourth Brazilian who won this pageant

Miss Brasil 2013
At Miss Brasil 2013, representing the state of Mato Grosso, Jakelyne defeated 26 other contestants and was crowned by Gabriela Markus on September 28, 2013.

Miss Universe 2013
Jakelyne represented Brazil at Miss Universe 2013 on November 9 in Moscow, Russia where she finished as 4th Runner-Up, equaling the placement of her predecessor Gabriela Markus at Miss Universe 2012. Brazil placed in the Top 5 for the 3rd consecutive year.

References

External links
Official Miss Brasil website

Brazilian female models
Miss Universe 2013 contestants
1993 births
Living people
People from Rondonópolis
Miss Brazil winners